Poul Christian Schindler (1648–1740) was a Danish composer.

References
This article was initially translated from the Danish Wikipedia.

Danish Baroque composers
Danish classical composers
Danish male classical composers
1648 births
1740 deaths
18th-century classical composers
18th-century male musicians